Conchucos District is one of eleven districts of the Pallasca Province in Peru.

Geography 
Other mountains are listed below:

Some of the lakes in the district are Challwaqucha, Kinwaqucha, Llamaqucha, Paryaqucha and T'uruqucha.

Etymology 
Conchucos means 'country of water' in Kulyi language (kon water, chucu country).

See also
 Cordillera Blanca

References

Districts of the Pallasca Province
Districts of the Ancash Region